Don't Cry Wolf is a 2003 Swedish comedy film directed by Clas Lindberg. Lindberg won the Audience Award at the 2003 Kristiansand International Children's Film Festival for the film.

Selected cast
Kjell Bergqvist ...  Roland Ström, Lillebror's father 
Daniel Bragderyd ...  Lillebror 
Helena Korsvall ...  Alex, Lillebror's sister 
Inga Ålenius ...  Märta, Lillebror's grandmother 
David Schlein-Andersen ...  Jens 
Karin Bjurström ...  Veronika, Jens's mother 
Rikard Svensson ...  Slim, thief 
Ivan Mathias Petersson ...  Frank, thief 
Conny Andersson ...  Peter, thief
Willy Karlsson ... Granit 
Svante Grundberg...  Guard at the museum
Gösta Hurtig-Möller ...  Guard at the museum
Putte Elgh ...  Guard at the museum 
Lennart Gustavsson ...  Chief at the museum 
Helen Vedle ... Cashier at the museum

External links

2003 films
2000s Swedish-language films
2000s children's comedy films
Swedish children's films
Films directed by Clas Lindberg
2003 comedy films
2000s Swedish films